Facing is a documentary series that portrays the lives of some of the most influential figures in history. The episodes combine archived photos and video footage with first person interviews from individuals who have known or "faced" these personalities; no single narrator for the series or any dramatization is involved. Produced by Network Entertainment, it is a five part series telecast on the National Geographic Channel. The series was nominated for the 2017 RealScreen Awards and Leo Awards. In the RealScreen Awards, it won the history/biographical category in a non-fiction series. It bagged several accolades in the Leo Awards including the best documentary program, best direction and best editing.

Episodes

See also
Facing Ali

References

External links
http://www.networkentertainment.ca/
http://channel.nationalgeographic.com/

National Geographic (American TV channel) original programming
2016 American television series debuts
2016 American television series endings
Documentaries about politics
Documentaries about music
2010s American documentary television series
Works about Pablo Escobar
Vladimir Putin
Cultural depictions of Arnold Schwarzenegger
Saddam Hussein